This list comprises all players who have participated in at least one league match for Miami FC from 2006 to 2010. Players who were on the roster but never played a first team game are not listed; players who appeared for the team in other competitions (US Open Cup, CONCACAF Champions League, etc.) but never actually made an USL appearance are noted at the bottom of the page where appropriate.

A "†" denotes players who only appeared in a single match.

A
  Mike Adeyemi
  Alex Afonso
  Gale Agbossoumonde
  Reinier Alcántara
  Bryan Arguez

B
  Sean Barrett
  Júnior Baiano
  Art Bartholomew
  Tristan Bowen
  Eric Brunner
  Orlando Bueso

C
  Steven Cabas
  Nacho Calcagno
  Luis Calix
  Sean Cameron
  Cauê
  Chukwudi Chijindu
  Cristiano

D
  Rachid Didouh
  Bryan Dominguez
  Mateus dos Anjos
  Chris Doyle

E
  Connally Edozien
  Facundo Erpen
  Michael Erush
  Jonathan Escobar

F
  Pedro Faife
  Gabard Fénélon
  Sean Fraser

G
  Juan Pablo Galavis
  Chris Gbandi
  Ariel Germiniani
  Oscar Gil-Alzate
  Hunter Gilstrap
  Matt Glaeser
  Jarryd Goldberg
  Christian Gómez
  Francisco Gomez
  Javier Gomez
  Douglas Goncalves
  Luchi Gonzalez
  Miguel Guante
  Stephane Guillaume
  Eddie Gutierrez

H
  Allen Handy
  Patrick Hannigan
  Luc Harrington
  Aaron Hohlbein

I
  Leo Inacio

J
  Jamil Jean-Jacques
  Stefan Jerome
  Avery John
  Julio Cesar

K
  Aaron King
  Zach Kirby
  Charlie Koniver
  Eric Kronberg

L
  Martyn Lancaster
  Leandro
  Tre Lee
  Bryan P. Loureiro
  Lennon

M
  Alen Marcina
  Jeffrey Matteo
  Gerson Mayen
  Bruno Menezes
  Tim Merritt
  Edwin Miranda
  Nicolás Mosquera

N
  Euzébio Neto
  Martin Nuñez

O
  Gerghiny Obas

P
  Caleb Patterson-Sewell
  Paulo Jr.
  Richard Perdomo
  Bryan Pérez
  Yaikel Perez
  Paulinho Le Petit
  Nelson Pizarro
  Pedro Power
  John Pulido

R
  Walter Ramírez
  Juan Ramos
  Mike Randolph
  Sam Reynolds
  Ricardinho
  J. P. Rodrigues
  Mario Rodríguez
  Romário

S
  Fabian Sandoval
  Edward Santeliz
  Josh Saunders
  Kenny Schoeni
  Diego Serna
  Brian Shriver
  Willie Sims

T
  Melvin Tarley
  Danilo Teixeira
  Abe Thompson
  Nicky Torres
  Ansu Toure
  Jack Traynor
  Zourab Tsiskaridze

V
  Sergio Van Kanten
  Danny Vasquez
  Eric Vasquez
  Kyle Veris

W
  Diego Walsh
  Christopher Williams

Z
  Zinho

Sources

Miami FC
 
Association football player non-biographical articles